The 1975–76 Rugby Football League season was the 81st season of rugby league football. The Championship was won by Salford and the Challenge Cup winners were St. Helens who beat Widnes 20-5 in the final. The Rugby League Premiership Trophy winners were also St. Helens who beat Salford 15-2 in the final.

The 1975–76 Players No.6 Trophy Winners were Widnes who beat Hull F.C. 19-13 in the final. The BBC2 Floodlit Trophy Winners were St. Helens who beat Dewsbury 22-2 in the final. Widnes beat Salford 16–7 to win the Lancashire County Cup, and Leeds beat Hull Kingston Rovers 15–11 to win the Yorkshire County Cup.

Championship

Salford won their sixth, and to date last, Championship. Dewsbury, Keighley, Huddersfield and Swinton were demoted to the Second Division.

Challenge Cup

In the Challenge Cup  final played at Wembley in front of a crowd of 89,982 St. Helens defeated Widnes 20-5. This was St Helens’ fifth Cup Final win in eight Final appearances.

Referee: Ron Moore (Wakefield)

St Helens 20
Geoff Pimblett (3 goals, 2 drop goal)
Les Jones
Eddie Cunningham (1 try)
Derek Noonan
Roy Mathias
Billy Benyon
Jeff Heaton (1 try)
John Mantle
Tony Karalius
Kel Coslett
George Nicholls
Eric Chisnall
David Hull
Sub. Peter Glynn (2 tries) on for Billy Benyon
Sub. Mel James on for John Mantle
Coach: Eric Ashton 

Widnes 5
Ray Dutton (2 goals)
Alan Prescott
Eric Hughes
Derek 'Mick' George
David Jenkins
David Eckersley
Reg Bowden
Nick Nelson
Keith Elwell (1 drop goal)
John Wood
John Foran
Mick Adams
Doug Laughton
Sub. Dennis O'Neill on for Alan Prescott
Sub. Barry Sheridan on for John Foran
Coach: 
The winner of the Lance Todd Trophy was St. Helens , Geoff Pimblett.

Premiership

In 1975–76 season the RFL introduced the Premiership Trophy competition. It was played at the end of the season with the top 8 in the league qualifying to play each other in a simple 1st versus 8th, 2nd versus 7th, 3rd versus 6th, and 4th versus 5th system. The final was played on a neutral venue. The competition was played until 1997 when it was scrapped.

This was the second end of season Premiership Play-off Final and was played in front of a crowd of 18,082 at Station Road, Swinton between the number four seeds, St Helens, and the number one seeds, Salford.

Referee: M.J.Naughton (Widnes)

St Helens - 15
Geoff Pimblett (3 goals)
Les Jones
Peter Glynn (1 try)
Derek Noonan
Roy Mathias
Billy Benyon
Jeff Heaton
John Mantle
Tony Karalius (1 try)
Mel James
George Nicholls
Eric Chisnall (1 try)
Kel Coslett
Substitute: Kenneth "Ken" Gwilliam on for Jeff Heaton

Salford - 2
David Watkins (2 drop goals)
Keith Fielding
Maurice Richards
Chris Hesketh
Graham
Butler
Steve Nash
Mike Coulman
Raistrick
William Sheffield
Knighton
Colin Dixon
Eric Prescott
Substitute: Sam Turnbull for Knighton
St Helens second-row forward, George Nicholls, was the winner of the Harry Sunderland Trophy as Man of the Match.

Second Division Championship
2nd Division Champions were Barrow, and they, Rochdale Hornets, Workington Town and Leigh were promoted to the First Division.

League Cup

References

Sources
1975–76 Rugby Football League season at wigan.rlfans.com
The Challenge Cup at The Rugby Football League website

1975 in English rugby league
Northern Rugby Football League seasons
1976 in English rugby league